Loop-the-Loop is a vertical loop or 360 degree turn in a roller coaster track, derived from a similar aerobatic maneuver.

Loop-the-Loop (or loop the loop, loop-de-loop) may also may refer to:

Roller coasters
Loop the Loop (Coney Island)
Loop the Loop (Olentangy Park)
Loop the Loop (Young's Pier)

Music
 "Loop de Loop", a 1963 hit single by Johnny Thunder
 "Loop de Loop (Flip Flop Flyin' in an Aeroplane)", a Beach Boys song from Endless Harmony Soundtrack
 "Loop-the-Loop" (song), J-pop singer Kotoko's 16th single
 Loop Da Loop, an alias of French-British musician Nicolas Jean-Pierre Dresti
 Loopdeloop, the second single by Chell and the Vetos

Other
 Loop the Loop, an alternative title for Slitherlink, a logic puzzle
 Loopy De Loop, a theatrical cartoon short series by Hanna and Barbera